The 2019–20 Gonzaga Bulldogs men's basketball team (also informally referred to as the Zags) represented Gonzaga University, located in Spokane, Washington, in the 2019–20 NCAA Division I men's basketball season. The team was led by head coach Mark Few, in his 21st season as head coach. This was the Bulldogs' 16th season at the on-campus McCarthey Athletic Center and 40th season as a member of the West Coast Conference. They finished the season 31–2, 15–1 in WCC play to be WCC regular season champions. They defeated San Francisco and Saint Mary's to be champions of the WCC tournament. They earned the WCC's automatic bid to the NCAA tournament. However, all postseason play, including the NCAA Tournament, was cancelled amid the COVID-19 pandemic, making this season the first one under Mark Few that they did not play in NCAA Tournament.

Previous season

The Bulldogs team finished the 2018–19 season 33–4, 16–0 in WCC play to win the WCC regular season championship. After losing to Saint Mary's in the WCC tournament, they received an at-large bid to the NCAA tournament, where they defeated Fairleigh Dickinson in the Round of 64, Baylor in the Round of 32, and then Florida State in the Sweet Sixteen, before losing to Texas Tech in the Elite Eight.

Offseason

Coaching changes

Departures

Additions to staff

Player departures

Incoming transfers

Left program before playing

Recruiting class of 2019

Recruiting class of 2020

Roster
 Roster is subject to change as/if players transfer or leave the program for other reasons.
 Oumar Ballo was ruled as an academic redshirt prior to the start of the 2019–20 season. He will have 4 years of eligibility remaining at the start of the 2020–21 season.
 Brock Ravet left the team due to personal reasons before the 2019–20 regular season began.
 Matthew Lang was awarded a basketball scholarship for the second semester of the 2019–20 season.

Coaching staff

Schedule and results

|-
!colspan=12 style=| Exhibition

|-
!colspan=12 style=| Non-conference regular season

|-
!colspan=12 style=|  WCC Regular Season

|-
!colspan=12 style=| WCC Tournament

Source

Rankings

*AP does not release post-NCAA Tournament rankings^Coaches did not release a Week 2 poll.

References

Gonzaga Bulldogs men's basketball seasons
Gonzaga
Gonzaga Bulldogs men's basketball
Gonzaga Bulldogs men's basketball